William George Jones was an English professional footballer of the 1930s. He played in either wing half position, or at outside right.

Born in Chatham, Kent, Jones joined Gillingham in 1929 from hometown club Chatham Town and went on to make 46 appearances for the club in The Football League. He left in 1932 and joined Sittingbourne.

References

Year of birth missing
Year of death missing
Sportspeople from Chatham, Kent
Footballers from Kent
English footballers
Association football wing halves
Association football outside forwards
Chatham Town F.C. players
Gillingham F.C. players
Sittingbourne F.C. players
English Football League players